Highs in the Mid-Sixties, Volume 7 (subtitled The Northwest) is a compilation album in the Highs in the Mid-Sixties series, featuring recordings that were released in Washington and Oregon. Highs in the Mid-Sixties, Volume 14 and Highs in the Mid-Sixties, Volume 16 are later volumes in the series that feature bands from these states.

Release data
This album was released in 1984 as an LP by AIP Records (as #AIP-10012).

Notes on the tracks
The Northwest is "Louie Louie" country, and three different versions are included here, including a cover of a follow-up song by Paul Revere & the Raiders. The Wilde Knights are well known for the widely reissued "Beaver Patrol" (featured on Pebbles, Volume 1 and Essential Pebbles, Volume 1, among others); this song is from their follow-up single. However, these Squires are not the same band as the legendary group, the Squires from Bristol, CT.

Track listing

Side 1
 Jack Bedient & the Chessmen: "Double Whammy" (Jack Bedient)
 Jolly Green Giants: "Busy Body" (R. L. Johnson) — rel. 1966
 H.B. & the Checkmates: "Louise, Louise" (H. B. Ahern)
 The Wilde Knights: "Just Like Me" (Rick Dey)
 The Chambermen: "Louie Go Home" (Mark Lindsay/Paul Revere)
 Jack Eely & the Courtmen: "Louie, Louie '66" (Richard Berry)
 The Squires: "Don't You Just Know It" (Huey Smith/Vincent)
 Jack Bedient & the Chessmen: "I Want You to Know" (Jack Bedient)

Side 2
 The Sires: "Come to Me Baby" (The Sires)
 The Lincolns: "Come Along and Dream" (Bobby Baxter) — rel. 1969
 The Express: "Long Green" (L. Easton)
 The Pastels: "Why Don't You Love Me?" (The Pastels)
 The Night Walkers: "Sticks and Stones" (McCasland/Hooper)
 Mr. Lucky and the Gamblers: "Take a Look at Me" (The Gamblers)
 The Bootmen: "Ain't It the Truth" (The Bootmen) — rel. 1966
 The Rock-N-Souls: "Not Like You" (S. Rogers/J. Kenfield)

Music of Oregon
Pebbles (series) albums
1984 compilation albums
Music of Washington (state)